Henry St Aubyn Murray  (14 January 1886 – 12 April 1943) was a New Zealand architect and athlete.

Biography
Murray was born in Christchurch, New Zealand, in 1886. He received his education at Christ's College. All Black Toby Murray was his cousin. After school, he went to the local architect Frederick John Barlow as an apprentice.

Murray was the New Zealand champion hurdler from 1906 to 1910 over 440 yards. He competed for Australasia in the 1908 Summer Olympics in London, England. He competed in two athletic events. In the 110 metres hurdles he was second in the heat (16.3). In the 400 metres hurdles he was second in the heat (59.8). As the heats were held as sudden death events, he did not qualify. He is listed as New Zealand Olympian number 2 by the New Zealand Olympic Committee.

He married Ismene Nola Simms on 5 April 1916 in Brisbane. She was the daughter of H. G. Simms from London who had lately lived in Christchurch. From later that year, Murray served with the 11th Field Company of the Royal Australian Engineers in WWI. In 1917, he won a Military Cross for bravery. The citation reads:

As an architect, Murray undertook many commissions for the Catholic Church. His best-known work in the Church of the Holy Name in Ashburton, which is registered by Heritage New Zealand as a Category I historic structure. The two other buildings designed by him that are registered by Heritage New Zealand, both as Category II, are the Scottish Hall in Invercargill and the Rangiora Town Hall. Another notable structure that he designed is the Akaroa War Memorial.

Murray was a flying officer in the Royal New Zealand Air Force during WWII. On Saturday, 10 April 1943, he was in a jeep that skidded on loose gravel near Whangarei Harbour and overturned. He died from his injuries early the following Monday morning, aged 57. Murray's funeral was held at St Mary's Catholic Church in Central Christchurch and he was buried at Ruru Lawn Cemetery in Bromley.

References

1886 births
1943 deaths
People educated at Christ's College, Christchurch
Athletes from Christchurch
New Zealand male hurdlers
Olympic athletes of New Zealand
Athletes (track and field) at the 1908 Summer Olympics
20th-century New Zealand architects
New Zealand recipients of the Military Cross
Burials at Ruru Lawn Cemetery
Australian military personnel of World War I
Australian recipients of the Military Cross
Royal New Zealand Air Force personnel
New Zealand military personnel of World War II
New Zealand military personnel killed in World War II
Road incident deaths in New Zealand
Olympic athletes of Australasia